Piran (known as İyirminci until 1991) is a village and municipality in the Lerik Rayon of Azerbaijan. It has a population of 885.

References

Populated places in Lerik District